#1 with a Bullet is the twenty-eighth studio album of American country and comedy singer Ray Stevens. It was released in June 1991. The album includes the singles "Working for the Japanese" and "Power Tools", which respectively reached numbers 62 and 72 on the Hot Country Songs charts. The album also includes a re-recording of "The Pirate Song," which was originally recorded for his 1986 album I Have Returned.

Critical reception
Dennis Miller of the Elmira, New York Star-Gazette gave the album a mostly positive review, writing that "Stevens is at his madcap best when he aims his satirical bullets at the contemporary." He considered "Teenage Mutant Kung Fu Chickens", "Workin' for the Japanese", and "You Gotta Have a Hat" among the best in this regard. He also thought that "The Pirate Song" was the best due to Stevens' portrayal of the two characters in the song. Giving it 3 out of 4 stars, Jack Hurst of Tribune Media called the album "just another Stevens album, meaning that its varied and imaginative music backs the occasional lame line along with lots of others that are howlingly funny."

Track listing

Personnel 
Compiled from liner notes.

Musicians
 Ray Stevens – vocals, acoustic piano, synthesizers
 Gary Prim – keyboards
 Mark Casstevens – acoustic guitars, banjo, mandolin
 Steve Gibson – electric guitars, bass guitar
 Stuart Keathley – bass guitar
 Tommy Wells – drums
 Wendy Johnson – backing vocals
 Jana King – backing vocals
 Lisa Silver – backing vocals

Production
 Ray Stevens – producer, arrangements 
 Stuart Keathley – recording engineer 
 Glenn Meadows – mastering 
 Simon Levy – design 
 Slick Lawson – photography 
 Recorded at Ray Stevens Studio (Nashville, Tennessee).
 Mastered at Masterfonics (Nashville, Tennessee).

Chart performance

Album

Singles

References

1991 albums
Ray Stevens albums
Curb Records albums